Francesco Sabino (born Naples, 1620) was an Italian composer. He was a nephew of brothers Giovan Maria Sabino and Donato Antonio Sabino.

References

1620 births
Year of death missing
Italian Baroque composers
Italian male classical composers